Sands Anderson PC is a United States law firm in Richmond, Virginia. It was founded in 1842, and now has more than 60 attorneys. It has six offices: Richmond, Christiansburg, Fredericksburg, Williamsburg, and McLean in Virginia; and Durham, North Carolina.

History 
The firm traces its beginnings to 1842, when Alexander Hamilton Sands, fourteen years old, moved to Richmond, Virginia, to work in the law office of his brother William G. Sands.

References

Law firms established in 1842
Law firms based in Richmond, Virginia
1842 establishments in Virginia
American companies established in 1842